Diplotomma is a genus of lichenized fungi in the family Caliciaceae. The genus has a widespread distribution and contains about 29 species. The genus was circumscribed by Julius von Flotow in 1849. It was later wrapped into Buellia before being segregated from that genus by David Hawksworth in 1980.

Selected species
, Species Fungorum accepts 10 species of Diplotomma:
Diplotomma alboatrum 
Diplotomma cedricola 
Diplotomma epipolium 
Diplotomma glaucoatrum 
Diplotomma hedinii 
Diplotomma murorum 
Diplotomma parasiticum 
Diplotomma pharcidium 
Diplotomma venustum 
Diplotomma vezdanum

References

Caliciales
Lichen genera
Caliciales genera
Taxa described in 1849
Taxa named by Julius von Flotow